Scopolia is a genus of four species of flowering plants in the family Solanaceae, native to Europe and Asia. The genus is named after Giovanni Scopoli (1723–88), a Tyrolean naturalist.
The genus has a disjunct distribution, with two recognised species in Central to Eastern Europe, (including the Caucasus), and two species in East Asia.
The two European species are:
Scopolia carniolica Jacq. of Slovenia, Austria and the Carpathian Mountains
Scopolia caucasica Kolesn. ex Kreyer of the Caucasus
and the two Asiatic species are:
Scopolia lutescens Y.N. Lee of Korea
Scopolia japonica Maxim. of Japan

The four species in the equally medicinal genus Anisodus 
Anisodus tanguticus (Maxim.) Pascher
Anisodus luridus Link ex Spreng.
Anisodus carniolicoides (C.Y.Wu & C.Chen) D'Arcy & Z.Y.Zhang
Anisodus acutangulus C.Y.Wu & C.Chen
have in the past been placed in the genus Scopolia, as has the monotypic genus Atropanthe with its single species Atropanthe sinensis Pascher.

Scopolia carniolica - the longest-known species and the one with the westernmost distribution - is a creeping perennial plant, with light green leaves and dull reddish-purple flowers (cream in the attractive and more ornamental variety hladnikiana, sometimes cultivated as a decorative plant).  Scopolia's extract (which contains a form of the alkaloid scopolamine) is used in at least one commercial stomach remedy (Inosea, produced by Sato Pharmaceutical).  The extract is an anti-spasmodic in low doses and may be used to relax smooth muscle tissue or prevent motion-sickness-induced nausea; in higher doses, it is a poison having hallucinogenic and memory-inhibiting effects.

Other alkaloids found in Scopolia carniolica include cuscohygrine, hyoscyamine, and atroscine.

The coumarin phenylpropanoids umbelliferone and scopoletin have been isolated from the roots of Scopolia japonica.

Comparison of Scopolia carniolica with Atropa belladonna

The existence of the synonym Scopolia atropoides (i.e. "Atropa-like Scopolia") for Scopolia carniolica demonstrates the perceived similarity between Scopolia carniolica and its better-known relative Deadly Nightshade (Atropa belladonna). The most obvious dissimilarity lies in the respective fruits, that of Scopolia being a pyxidium (i.e. a dry, pot-like capsule with an operculum (lid)) while that of Atropa is a juicy, glistening, jet-black berry bearing a superficial resemblance to a cherry - indeed this pyxidium / berry dichotomy constitutes the feature separating the genus Atropa into a subtribe of its own within the Solanaceous tribe Hyoscyameae: all other genera in tribe Hyoscyameae have the same type of dry, pyxidial capsule as Scopolia.
Other points of dissimilarity include:
Pedicel type: Scopolia carniolica, long, slender and delicate / Atropa belladonna, shorter and broadening toward the calyx - particularly at fruiting.
Calyx type: Scopolia carniolica, cup-shaped, with slight peaks rather than distinct lobes / Atropa belladonna distinctly lobed, the individual lobes somewhat leaf-like and these lobes spreading to make the calyx star-shaped in fruit.
Colour of corolla: Scopolia carniolica, exterior: purplish-brown striped longitudinally with cream veins, interior: cream, except for some dark venation at the very base / Atropa belladonna, dull purple shading to green netted with darker veins at the base.
Glabrescence / pubescence: Scopolia carniolica, glabrous (hairless), the corolla often having a glossy, "enameled" appearance / Atropa belladonna pubescent (hairy), the corolla and calyx being clothed in short trichomes (hairs) - though less so in those of its eastern subspecies A. belladonna ssp. caucasica.
Corolla shape: Scopolia carniolica, simple, un-lobed, straight-sided bell / Atropa belladonna urceolate (= urn-shaped) bell bearing short but distinct lobes, somewhat recurved.
Pistil: Scopolia carniolica, straight and shorter than corolla / Atropa belladonna, curved and exserted (=protruding beyond corolla).

Gallery

References

Further reading

Hyoscyameae
Solanaceae genera